Spice (stylized as SPICE) is an American rock supergroup based in San Francisco, California. The band consists of Ross Farrar and Jake Casarotti of Ceremony, Ian Simpson of Creative Adult and Cody Sullivan of Sabertooth Zombie. The band formed in 2018, and in 2020 released their eponymous debut album.

Background 
SPICE formed in 2018 with members of Ceremony, Creative Adult, Sabertooth Zombie, and No Sir. In describing the formation of the new band and their music the band stated:

On April 29, 2020, SPICE released their debut single off of the self-titled album, called "First Feeling". With their second single, "All My Best Shit", which came out on May 20, 2020, the band announced the debut of their album, which came out on July 17, 2020.

Discography

Studio albums 
 SPICE (2020)
 Viv (2022)

Singles 
 "First Feeling" (2020)
 "All My Best Shit" (2020)
 "26 Dogs" (2020)
 "A Better Treatment b/w Everyone Gets In" (2021)
 "Any Day Now" (2022)
 "Bad Fade" (2022)

References

External links 
 Official website

American experimental rock groups
Musical groups established in 2018
Musical quintets
Rock music supergroups
Dais Records artists
2018 establishments in California